Zacari Moses Pacaldo I (born April 8, 1994), known mononymously as Zacari, is an American singer, songwriter, rapper, and multi-instrumentalist. He is signed to Top Dawg Entertainment and released his EP Run Wild Run Free on March 15, 2019.

Early life
Pacaldo was raised by a highly musical family. His mother, Ede, a former drummer for rock bands, taught Pacaldo how to play the guitar, and his father, Moses, passed down his love of soul, blues, and jazz music. He was enrolled in a school for performing arts by age eight and began learning guitar, followed by drums, saxophone, and keyboards. Pacaldo had a stint in Alaska where he worked for the summer after graduating high school. After finishing high school, he worked seasonally for three years at an Alaska national park, and enrolled in a music school in Los Angeles, California.

Career
Zacari was featured on various Top Dawg Entertainment albums such as The Sun's Tirade, Do What Thou Wilt., Damn, and Black Panther: The Album. Top Dawg announced the signing of Zacari in January 2019, when he released his first single on the label "Don't Trip". His debut EP Run Wild Run Free was released on March 15, 2019.

On April 21, 2020, as part of Top Dawg's Fan Appreciation Week, Zacari released the songs "Edamame" and "This Woman's Work".

Discography

Extended plays

Singles as featured artist

Certified songs

Other guest appearances

References

1994 births
Living people
Musicians from Bakersfield, California
American hip hop singers
Top Dawg Entertainment artists
Alternative hip hop musicians
21st-century American singers
Singer-songwriters from California
Alternative R&B musicians
American male singer-songwriters
American contemporary R&B singers